Atrevido (Spanish and Portuguese for "daring", "bold") may refer to:

 Atrevido (album), Trueno, 2020
 "Atrevido", the album's title track
 Atrevido (Ranking Stone album), 1994
 "Atrevido", a song by Orishas from A Lo Cubano
 Atrevidos, an Ecuadorian TV program

See also